Island Line or Island line may refer to:
 Island line (MTR), one of the lines of the MTR metro system in Hong Kong
 Island Line, Isle of Wight, a railway line on the Isle of Wight, England
 Island Line (brand), a train operating company on the Isle of Wight, England